Victor Alexandre Ginsburgh (born 1939 in Rwanda-Urundi) is a Belgian economist.

Biography
Ginsburgh was born in 1939 into an expatriate family: "My father was only a white Russian, and my mother an Austrian Jew".

Victor Ginsburgh studied at the Free University of Brussels (now split into the Université Libre de Bruxelles and the Vrije Universiteit Brussel) and mastered in econometrics. He earned an economics PhD in 1972. He has been an Economics professor at Université Libre de Bruxelles since 1975.

He is now an honorary professor. He is former co-director of the European Center for Advanced Research in Economics and Statistics (ECARES). He has been visiting professor in several US universities (Yale, University of Virginia, Chicago University), as well as in France (Paris and Marseille), and Belgium (Louvain and Liège). He is also member of the Center for Operations Research and Econometrics (CORE), Université catholique de Louvain.

He wrote and edited a dozen books, including The Structure of Applied General Equilibrium, Cambridge, MA., MIT Press, 1997, with M. Keyzer, and How Many Languages Do We Need, Princeton University Press, 2011 with Shlomo Weber, and is the author or coauthor of over 180 papers on topics in applied and theoretical economics, including industrial organization and general equilibrium analysis. His more recent interests go to the economics of languages, as well as to art history and art philosophy, two fields in which he tries to put to use his (self-taught) knowledge of economics. He has published over 50 papers on these topics, some of which appeared in the American Economic Review, the Journal of Political Economy, Games and Economic Behavior, the Journal of Economic Perspectives and the European Economic Review.

Ginsburgh is the author or coauthor of papers on topics in applied and theoretical economics, including industrial organization and general equilibrium analysis.

Political views 
He is known in Belgium for his criticism towards Israel politics which he has expressed in numerous articles.

Selected bibliography

Books
How Many Languages Do We Need? The Economics of Linguistic Diversity, Princeton, NJ: Princeton University Press, 2011, viii + 232p. (with S. Weber).
The Structure of Applied General Equilibrium Models, Cambridge, Mass.: MIT Press, 1997 and 2002 for the paperback edition (with M. Keyzer).
Activity Analysis and General Equilibrium Modelling, Amsterdam: North- Holland, 1981, 370p. (with J. Waelbroeck).
La République Populaire de Chine. Cadres Institutionnels et Réalisations: La Planification et la Croissance Economique 1949-1959, Bruxelles: Editions de l'Institut de Sociologie, 1963, 188p.

Edited books
The Handbook of the Economics of Art and Culture, vol. 2, Amsterdam: Elsevier, in preparation (with D. Throsby).
The Handbook of the Economics of Art and Culture, vol. 1, Amsterdam: Elsevier, 2006, xxxv + 1321 p. (with D. Throsby).

Selected papers
Rock and Roll Bands, (In)complete Contracts and Creativity, American Economic Review, Papers and Proceedings 101 (2011), 217-221 (with C. Ceulemans and P. Legros).
Endowments, production technologies and the quality of wines in Bordeaux. Does terroir matter?, The Economic Journal 118 (2008), F142-F157 (with O. Gergaud).
Disenfranchisement in linguistically diverse societies. The case of the European Union, Journal of the European Economic Association 3 (2005), 946-964 (with I. Ortuno-Ortin and S. Weber).
Awards, success and aesthetic quality in the arts, Journal of Economic Perspectives 17 (2003), 99-111.
The museum pass game and its value, Games and Economic Behavior 43 (2003), 322-325 (with I. Zang).
Expert opinion and compensation: evidence from a musical competition, American Economic Review 93 (2003), 289-298 (with J. van Ours).
On invisible trade relations between Mesopotamian cities during the third millennium B.C., The Professional Geographer 53 (2001), 374-383 (with A. Bossuyt and L. Broze).
Absentee bidders and the declining price anomaly in wine auctions, Journal of Political Economy 106 (1998), 1302–1322.

References

External links
Webpage at ECARES
Ginsburgh's personal weblog

Belgian economists
Cultural economists
Cultural economics
1939 births
Living people
Free University of Brussels (1834–1969) alumni